Spencer Gosch (born January 22, 1984) is an American politician who has served in the South Dakota House of Representatives from the 23rd district since 2017. He served as Speaker Pro Tempore during the 2019–2020 legislative sessions and is currently serving as Speaker of the House.

Election history

2020     Gosch was re-elected with 8,325 votes; Charles Hoffman was also elected with 6,791 votes.
Gosch won the Republican primary election with 3,107 votes along with Charles Hoffman who received 2,709 votes while James Wangsness received 1,072 votes and Kevin Watts received 755 votes.

2018     Gosch was re-elected with 7,115 votes; John Lake was re-elected with 6,435 votes and Eleanor Iverson received 2,105 votes and Margaret Ann Walsh received 1,717 votes.
2016     Gosch was elected with 7,099 votes; John Lake was elected with 6,094 votes. In the Republican primary, Gosch received 2,135 votes and received the Republican nomination along with John Lake who received 2,466 votes who defeated Charles Hoffman who received 1,706 votes and Dick Werner who received 1,607 votes.

References

External links 
 Official Page at the South Dakota Legislature
 Spencer Gosch on Twitter
 Spencer Gosch on Vote Smart

|-

1984 births
21st-century American politicians
Living people
People from Mobridge, South Dakota
University of South Dakota alumni
Republican Party members of the South Dakota House of Representatives